Ferdows is a giant oil and gas field of Iran, located in the Persian Gulf,  south-east from the city of Bushehr and  from the coast. It was explored in 2003. Prior to 2007, it was among the three largest in the world after Al Ghawar and Burgan.

Ferdows is associated with the deposits of Mound and Zagheh and their stocks are recorded together. Ferdows has a gas cap.

Geological reserves are estimated at 38 billion barrels or 6.3 billion tonnes of oil and 300 billion cubic metres of natural gas. Thus, the main reserves are in the field of Ferdows: 30,6 billion barrels, Mound field contains 6.63 billion barrels, Zagheh field - 1,3 billion barrels.

See also

List of oil fields

References

Oil fields of Iran